The 2002–03 Northern Counties East Football League season was the 21st in the history of Northern Counties East Football League, a football competition in England.

Premier Division

The Premier Division featured 18 clubs which competed in the previous season, along with two new clubs:
Bridlington Town, promoted from Division One
Ossett Albion, relegated from the Northern Premier League

League table

Division One

Division One featured 15 clubs which competed in the previous season, along with two new clubs, joined from the Central Midlands League:
Long Eaton United
Shirebrook Town

League table

References

External links
 Northern Counties East Football League

2002-03
8